Lilla Edet Municipality (Lilla Edets kommun) is a municipality in Västra Götaland County in western Sweden. Its seat is located in the town of Lilla Edet.

The present municipality was formed in 1971, when the market town (köping) Lilla Edet (instituted as late as 1951) was merged with Flundre (part of), Inlands Torpe and Lödöse.

Population figures from Statistics Sweden as of December 31, 2005.

Lilla Edet (seat) (pop. 4,936)
Lödöse (pop. 1,265)
Göta (pop. 962)
Nygård (pop. 436)
Hjärtum (pop. 384)

Of these localities, Lödöse is nationally known for being the original location of the city of Gothenburg. In the medieval age it was a busy city and hosted an important Swedish harbor, until it was moved to its present location in 1473, and little remained. Today it has an interesting museum with many objects.

Industry
The largest employer in Lilla Edet Municipality apart from the government is the paper mill "SCA Hygiene Products AB Edet Bruk", with some 500 employees. It has been in operation for some 120 years, and is best known today for its manufacturing of the toilet paper brand "Edet", available in every store in Sweden.

Friendship cities 
 Nurmijärvi, Finland

References

External links

Lilla Edet Municipality - Official site
The local newspaper (TTELA)

Municipalities of Västra Götaland County
Metropolitan Gothenburg
North Älvsborg